N. Soundrapandian was an India politician and two times Member of Legislative Assembly. He was elected to Tamil Nadu legislative assembly from Radhapuram constituency in 1962 and 1967 elections as an Indian National Congress candidate.

References 

Indian National Congress politicians from Tamil Nadu
Living people
Year of birth missing (living people)
Madras MLAs 1962–1967
Tamil Nadu MLAs 1967–1972